Maro Sargsyan (born November 29, 1973, Yerevan), is an Armenian artist.

Biography  
In 1988–1992 Sargsyan studied at the Department of Painting and Graphic Arts at State College of Fine Arts of Armenia, named after Panos Terlemezyan. In 1993–1999 studied at the Academy of Fine Arts of Armenia, at the chair of Painting. In 2012–13 studied at CSDCA.
Member of the Artists' Union of Armenia since 2001, She was a member of the Designers' Union of Armenia; International Association of Designers since 2002, member of Paris union of artists "les seize anges" since 2014. Father: Zenon Sargsyan, mother: Armenian artist, potter Anahit Savayan, uncle: Armenian painter Armen Svayan, grandfather: Yeprem Savayan, honoured Art Worker of SSSR.

Exhibitions 
1984 Exhibition of Art of Armenia (Moscow)
1988 Student Exhibition (P. Terlemezyan State College of Fine Arts, Yerevan)
1989 Student Exhibition (P. Terlemezyan State College of Fine Arts, Yerevan)
1990 Student Exhibition (P. Terlemezyan State College of Fine Arts, Yerevan)
1991 Student Exhibition (P. Terlemezyan State College of Fine Arts, Yerevan)
1991 Charity Exhibition and Sale (Yerevan)
1993 Autumn Exhibition (Yerevan)
1994 Collective Exhibition (Spain)
1995 Spring Exhibition (Yerevan)
1996 Personal Exhibition (Yerevan)
1997 Spring Exhibition (Yerevan)
1998 Spring Exhibition (Yerevan)
2004 Spring Exhibition (Yerevan)
2006 Personal Exhibition (Cite Internationale des Arts, Paris)
2008 Personal Exhibition (Yerevan)
2008 Autumn Exhibition (Yerevan)
2008 Spring Exhibition (Yerevan)
2008 Exhibition dedicated to the Armenian Genocide (Yerevan)
2009 Autumn Exhibition (Yerevan)
2010 Collective Exhibition (Russia, Saransk, Charter)
2010 Open studio (Cite Internationale des Arts, Paris)
2011 Collective Exhibition (Russia, Kazan, Charter)
2011 Personal Exhibition (Yerevan)
2011 Personal Exhibition (Gallery Gavart, Paris)
2012 Spring Exhibition (Yerevan)
2012 Annual Exhibition in Espace Miremont de Plan de Cuques (Marseille)
2013   "East to west. Modern to postmodern"  (Yerevan)
2014 Galerie Gavart (Paris)
2014   Exhibition in Kuweit  KUNA news

Exhibition "Impressions from Paris"

See also 
List of Armenian artists

References

External links 

Maro Sargsyan's Official website
Maro Sargsyan's works
Maro Sargsyan in «Karkach» TV programme, part 1
Maro Sargsyan in «Karkach» TV programme, part 2

1973 births
Armenian painters
Living people